Kucher may refer to:

 Kucher, Iran, a village in Kurdistan Province, Iran
 Kucher Model K1, Hungarian machine gun

See also
 
 Kucher (surname)
 Simon-Kucher & Partners, consulting company